Orthodox liturgical calendar may refer to:

Eastern Orthodox Church liturgical calendar
A special Hebrew calendar, also called a luach, normally used in synagogues belonging to Orthodox Judaism which lists the Jewish liturgy and prayers and blessings to be recited during the week, Sabbaths, and on Jewish holidays